Fırat may refer to:

 Fırat (surname), a surname (including a list of people with the name)
 Fırat River
 Fırat University,  Elazığ, Turkey

People with the given name
 Fırat Akkoyun (born 1982), Turkish footballer
 Firat Arslan (born 1970), German boxer
 Fırat Aydınus (born 1973), Turkish football referee
 Fırat Çelik (born 1981), Turkish-German actor
Fırat Kaya (born 1995), Germany-born Turkish deaf footballer
 Fırat Kocaoğlu (born 1988), Turkish footballer

See also
 Firat (disambiguation)
 Burkan el-Fırat